The Uruguay national roller hockey team is the national team side of Uruguay at international roller hockey. Usually it is part of FIRS Roller Hockey World Cup and CSP Copa América.

Current squad

Players
The following players were named in the squad for the 2010 FIRS Roller Hockey B World Cup

Team Staff
 General manager:
 Mechanic:

Coaching Staff
 Head coach: Jorge Escobar
 Assistant: Jimeno Xavi

References

External links
Uruguay Roller Sports Federation

National Roller Hockey Team
Roller hockey
National roller hockey (quad) teams